Irina Ivanova (born 19 April 1996) is a Russian athlete. She competed in the women's pole vault event at the 2019 World Athletics Championships.

References

External links

1996 births
Living people
Russian female pole vaulters
Place of birth missing (living people)
Authorised Neutral Athletes at the World Athletics Championships
21st-century Russian women